Aphidicolin is a tetracyclic diterpene antibiotic isolated from the fungus Cephalosporum aphidicola with antiviral and antimitotic properties.  Aphidicolin is a reversible inhibitor of eukaryotic nuclear DNA replication. It blocks the cell cycle at early S phase. It is a specific inhibitor of DNA polymerase Alpha and Delta in eukaryotic cells and in some viruses (vaccinia and herpesviruses) and an apoptosis inducer in HeLa cells.  Natural aphidicolin is a secondary metabolite of the fungus Nigrospora oryzae.

Bibliography

References 

Antibiotics
Transferase inhibitors
Diterpenes
Cyclopentanes
DNA polymerase inhibitors